Icosium was a Berber city that was part of Numidia which became an important  Roman colony and an early medieval bishopric (now a Latin titular see) in the casbah area of actual Algiers.

History 

The history of Icosium goes back to around 400 BC when a small Berber village was created by some local fishermen. Only when 3000 Roman veterans settled there as colonists during Augustus times, Icosium grew in importance.

Legends
Icosium's Greek name Ikósion was later explained as deriving from the Greek word for "twenty" (eíkosi), supposedly because it had been founded by twenty companions of Heracles when he visited the Atlas Mountains during his labors.

However, the berber settlement was also occupied by some Punic settlers from at least as early as the 3rd century BC. They called it Yksm, which is believed to have meant "seagull's island", and which was eventually transcribed as Icosium in Latin. The original Punic name is reflected in the modern Arabic name for Algiers (pronounced Al Jaza'ir), which means "the islands".

Roman town

In 146BC, Icosium became part of the Roman Empire. The city was given Latin rights by the emperor Vespasian. Roman Icosium existed on what was the "marine quarter" of the city of Algiers until 1940. The Rue de la Marine followed the lines of what used to be a Roman street, and a ruined aqueduct was visible by Algiers's "Gate of Victory" as late as 1845. Roman cemeteries existed near Bab-el-Oued and Bab Azoun. Under the Romans, there were also other settlements nearby on the banks of the Haratob (the classical Savus). 

Many Roman colonists settled in Icosium under Augustus and -after was promoted to Roman colonia by Vespasian- the latin was the language spoken in the city in the first century AD. The city -of nearly 15000 inhabitants, according to historian Theodore Mommsen- was given full Latin rights by Roman emperor Vespasian.

By the 2nd century, an influx of Berbers from the countryside changed the settlement's demographics, so that Latin-speakers became a minority elite.

Christianity started to be practiced in the late 2nd century, and in the early 4th century was the main religion of the local Romanised Berbers in the city. The bishops of Icosium are mentioned as late as the 5th century. At the Christian council of Carthage in AD419 (promoted  by Saint Aurelius) went the bishop Laurentius "Icositanus", as representative of Mauretania Caesariensis: Saint Augustine wrote about him in a letter to Pope CelestineI.

Later history

Icosium remained part of the Roman Empire until it was conquered by Vandals in 430. In 442, an agreement between the Roman Empire and the Vandals allowed Icosium to be occupied by the Romans during the Vandal control of northern Mauretania Caesariensis. Some berber tribes took control of the city at the beginning of the 6th century, but the town was later reconquered by the Byzantine Empire. This happened just before the Arab conquest in the late 7th century. 
 
Icosium was then destroyed by the Arabs and reduced to a very small village in the 8th century. Most of the romanized inhabitants were killed or sent as slaves to Damascus. Until 950, only ruins remained of the Roman Icosium.
 

 
Only in the 10th century started to be again developed by Buluggin ibn Ziri, a Berber who funded Algeria under zirid dynasty, to what is now the capital of modern Algeria. Indeed the Casbah of Algiers (a UNESCO world heritage site) is founded mainly on the ruins of old Icosium. It is a mid-sized city which, built on a hill, goes down towards the sea and is divided in two: the High city and the Low city, that now are dangerously crumbling

Religion
Around 400, a diocese of Icosium was established under Roman rule, which was suppressed around 500, presumably by the Arian Vandals. In 1700, the diocese was nominally restored as titular bishopric of Icosium. On 10 August 1838 the titular see ceased to exist as the residential diocese was restored under the city's modern name as Roman Catholic Diocese of Algiers, which was promoted on 25 July 1866 as Metropolitan Archdiocese of Algiers.

List of bishops

Three bishops are known from antiquity:
 Crescens (Donatist bishop attendee at the Council of Carthage (411))
 Lavrentius (Catholic bishop attendee at Council of Carthage (419))
 Victor (Catholic bishop fl.484)
 
The titular bishops, all of the episcopal (lowest) rank, were:
 Manuel Tercero Rozas, OESA (26 November 1727 – 4 July 1752)
 Aloisio Gandolfi, CM (8 November 1815 – 25 August 1825)
 Saint Bishop Eugène-Charles-Joseph de Mazenod, OMI (1 October 1832 – 2 October 1837)

References

Citations

Bibliography
 .

External links
 GCatholic Algiers Archdiocese
 Detailed article -with maps- on hIcosium (in French)

History of Algiers
Phoenician colonies in Algeria
Roman towns and cities in Algeria
Catholic titular sees in Africa